Castle Donington Power Station was a coal-fired power station situated on the River Trent near Castle Donington, Leicestershire,  south-east of Derby. Construction began in 1951, and the station opened in 1958.

History
The station had six 100 megawatt turbo-generators manufactured by Metropolitan-Vickers and boilers by Babcock & Wilcox.  The boilers operated on pulverised coal and delivered 630 kg/s of steam at 103.4 bar and 566 °C. Station cooling was by river water and four cooling towers. Castle Donington was one of the CEGB's twenty steam power stations with the highest thermal efficiency; in 1963–4 the thermal efficiency was 32.30 per cent, 31.57 per cent in 1964–5, and 31.45 per cent in 1965–6. In 1980/1 the station sent out 2,072.453 GWh, the thermal efficiency was then 29.34 per cent. It was initially operated by the Central Electricity Generating Board. Following privatisation in 1990, the station was operated by Powergen. In 1993, four of the station's generating units were decommissioned. In 1994, the remaining two units were taken out of operation and the station closed down.

Castle Donington power station was supplied with coal via a branch off the adjacent Trent and Weston railway line. Rail facilities included an east-facing junction on the mainline, four loading arrival sidings, a gross-weight weighbridge, a four-track set of unloading hoppers, a tare-weight weighbridge, and four empty departure sidings.

The cooling water system enabled the abstraction of up to 113,700 m3/h (25 million gallons per hour) of water from the River Trent. There was provision for up to 81,800 m3/h (18 million gallons per hour to be pumped from the outlet channel through cooling towers back to the inlet channel for reuse.

The power station's internal railway system had the last steam locomotives in regular industrial usage in Great Britain. The two 0-4-0 saddle tank locos were built in 1953 by Robert Stephenson and Hawthorns Ltd and went into preservation upon the power station's closure with No. 1 now on the Midland Railway in Derbyshire.

The annual electricity output, in GWh, of Castle Donington was:

The power station has since been demolished and a distribution centre for Marks & Spencer has been developed on the site.

References

External links
Photos of Castle Donington on Power Stations Revisited.

Buildings and structures in Leicestershire
Power stations in the East Midlands
Energy infrastructure completed in 1958
1958 establishments in England
1994 disestablishments in England